Pareja is a municipality in Spain.

Pareja also may refer to:

Alfredo Pareja Diezcanseco (1908–1993), Ecuadorian novelist, essayist, journalist, historian and diplomat
Bartolomé Ramos de Pareja (ca. 1440–1522), Spanish mathematician, music theorist, and composer
Eusebio Sánchez Pareja, 18th-century Spanish colonial official in New Spain
Francisco Pareja (ca. 1570–1628), Franciscan missionary in Spanish Florida
Francisco de Rivera y Pareja (1561–1637), Spanish prelate
Gustavo Pareja Cisneros (b. 1947), Ecuadorian politician
Isabel Rosales Pareja (1895–1961), Ecuadorian pianist
Jennifer Pareja Lisalde (b. 1984) Spanish water polo player
Jésus Pareja (b. 1955), Spanish racing driver
José Antonio Pareja (1757–1813), Spanish admiral
José Manuel Pareja (1813–1865), Spanish admiral
Juan de Pareja (c. 1606–1670), Spanish painter
Juan Gabriel Pareja (b. 1978), American actor
Manuel Pareja Obregón (1933–1995), Spanish musician and composer
Miguel Donoso Pareja (1931–2015), Ecuadorian writer
Nicolás Pareja (b. 1984), Argentine professional footballer
Óscar Pareja (b. 1968), Colombian professional football player and manager
Pedro Pareja Duque (b. 1989), commonly known as Pedrito, Spanish footballer
Rafael Pérez Pareja (1836–1897), Ecuadorian politician
Susana Pareja Ibarra (b. 1973), Spanish handball player and coach

See also
Portrait of Juan de Pareja
Vivanco–Pareja Treaty